Schefflera sprucei is a species of plant in the family Araliaceae. It is found in Brazil, Ecuador, and Peru.

References

sprucei
Least concern plants
Taxonomy articles created by Polbot
Taxobox binomials not recognized by IUCN